Galatians may refer to:

 Galatians (people)
 Epistle to the Galatians, a book of the New Testament
 English translation of the Greek Galatai or Latin Galatae, Galli, or Gallograeci to refer to either the Galatians or the Gauls in general

See also
 Galatia in Asia Minor
 Galatia (Roman province)
 Galatian (disambiguation)